Cymindis arcana is a species of ground beetle in the subfamily Harpalinae. It was described by Emetz in 1972.

References

arcana
Beetles described in 1972